Schuldiner and Shuldiner is a surname sometimes found among Jewish people. It is popularly thought to mean , a synagogue sexton, although no evidence exists to justify this meaning. In Pennsylvania during the 18th century the term "shul diener" was used by German Christians in America to designate those who taught children and were literally "school servants" to people who could afford to hire them. Perhaps the most famous of these schul dieners was the American fractur artist, Johann Adam Eyer, who signed his name Johann Adam Eyer, S.D., for "Schul Diener". In all likelihood, Jewish schul dieners were rabbis who, like their Christian counterparts, were also teachers. Notable people with the surname include:

 Chuck Schuldiner (1967–2001), American guitarist and singer
 Maya Schuldiner, Israeli biologist
 Reed Shuldiner, American law professor
 Shimon Schuldiner (1946–), Israeli biochemist

References 

Jewish surnames